Cherry Gully is a locality in the Southern Downs Region, Queensland, Australia.

History 
The locality takes its name from a local gully name. There are a number of stories about the name of the gully. One story is that in mid-nineteenth century a cask of sherry fell from a wagon into the gully, with the word sherry being corrupted later to cherry. In another story, carriers stopped at the gully and drank sherry from the cargo to excess and again the word sherry was corrupted to cherry. The other story is that the gully has many wild cherry trees.

Education 
There are no schools in Cherry Gully. The nearest government primary school is Dalveen State School in neighbouring Dalveen to the south-west. The nearest government secondary school is Warwick State High School in Warwick to the north.

References 

Southern Downs Region
Localities in Queensland